Call Me Fitz is a Canadian television series produced by E1 Entertainment, Amaze Film & Television, and Big Motion Pictures.  The half-hour comedy stars Jason Priestley as Richard "Fitz" Fitzpatrick, a morally bankrupt used-car salesman whose consequence-free life is complicated by the arrival of do-gooder Larry (Ernie Grunwald), another salesman who claims he is Fitz's conscience.

The series is co-produced by Movie Central (western Canada) and The Movie Network (central/eastern Canada), for airing on those two channels and their jointly owned channel HBO Canada (Canada wide).  The first thirteen-episode season of the show premiered on HBO Canada in September 2010, with subsequent seasons premiering in September 2011, 2012, and October 2013.

The series was filmed in New Minas, Nova Scotia.

Synopsis
The show stars Priestley as Richard Fitzpatrick, a used-car salesman walking a fine line of acceptable behaviour on the lot alongside a new salesman, do-gooder Larry, who claims to be the embodiment of his conscience. Fitz's idealisation of Frank Sinatra and his dysfunctional family have shaped him into the cocksure anti-hero he is proud to be. Fitz's ambition is to get out of 'slinging tin' at his family's used car dealership and open his own lounge, the Summerwind. In the meantime, he is content to make the Duncan Underwood Inn his watering hole. Fitz does not like the Ruptal cousins, whom he refers to as "9" and "11", and their used-car dealership across the street from Fitzpatrick Motors.

Fitz hits rock bottom when he crashes a GT while on a test drive and the customer ends up in a coma. Fitz meets Ali while in jail and at first believes her to be his lawyer until she says "mom", referring to Fitz's customer in the coma. In an attempt to avoid a pending attempted vehicular manslaughter charge Fitz decides to marry Babs, who comes out of her coma just in time to get married. Ali admits her attraction to Fitz after her mother tells him she wants a divorce and while they are making out in her car Ali accidentally steps on the accelerator and drives into and kills her mother.

In season two Fitz's attempts to open the Summerwind are thwarted by city council and Fitz is the prime suspect in the disappearance and suspected homicide of Sonja.  Fitz decides to run for city council in season three. The news that Ali is pregnant with his baby does little to inspire Fitz to change his ways. Through an unfortunate series of mishaps Fitz ends up as mayor of Coverton. Fitz's rampant promiscuity is matched only by his corruption, which eventually lands him in prison. Fitz breaks out of prison just as Ali goes into labour.

With Ali having abandoned their son Fitz is left struggling with the challenges of being a single father in season four.

In an interview with RTÉ Jason Priestley described the show as "booze, blow and broads or Sunday night at Charlie Sheen's house."

Cast
Jason Priestley as Richard "Fitz" Fitzpatrick
Ernie Grunwald as Larry
Peter MacNeill as Ken Fitzpatrick
Joanna Cassidy as Elaine Fitzpatrick (recurring seasons 1–3, regular season 4)
Kathleen Munroe as Ali Devon
Tracy Dawson as Meghan Fitzpatrick
Donavon Stinson as Josh McTaggart
Brooke Nevin as Sonja Lester
Huse Madhavji as Ruptal 1
Shaun Shetty as Ruptal 2
Jonathan Torrens as Chester Vince
Amy Sloan as Dot Foxley
Anne Openshaw as Alice Fitzpatrick

Production
It was announced in November 2009 that principal photography had begun on the first season of Call Me Fitz and that filming would continue in the Annapolis Valley until mid-January 2010.  Subsequent seasons continued production in the Annapolis Valley, primarily in the town of New Minas, Nova Scotia. Season 4 was primarily shot in the Dartmouth area

In order to achieve the feel of the Rat Pack era to which Fitz relates the soundtrack is primarily performed by Canadian jazz singer Matt Dusk.

Prior to season four Priestley was critical of the promotion of the show, saying in response to people learning of the show via Twitter,  "Traditional advertising is also still get a great way to get the word out, and I think that our broadcasters have not done a good job with traditional means for our show. I'm going to be totally frank with you about that: I don't think they've done a good job at all. I don't understand, we're the most awarded comedy in Canadian television history and half the people in this country don't even know we exist, and I can't fathom that.". Priestley later added, "It's frustrating when you feel like you're not being successful in getting the word out there, but I think a lot of that has to do with budget and money, and money being allocated to other places.".

Broadcast
Call Me Fitz is co-produced by Movie Central (western Canada) and The Movie Network (central/eastern Canada), for airing on those two channels after premiering on their jointly owned channel HBO Canada (Canada wide).  The first thirteen-episode season premiered on HBO Canada in September 2010, the thirteen-episode second season premiered in September 2011, and the twelve-episode third season premiered on HBO Canada in September 2012. The ten-episode fourth season premiered in October 2013.  All four seasons also have regular runs and reruns on Movie Central, The Movie Network and HBO Canada.

The series has been sold in over 60 foreign markets, including its American debut on the DirecTV exclusive The 101 Network (since renamed Audience Network) on April 21, 2011, with two back-to-back episodes, and was shown Thursdays at 9 pm ET/PT. Season 2 started on Audience on November 3 in the 9:30 pm time slot.

Awards
The first season of Call Me Fitz was nominated for 16 Gemini Awards and won seven, including Best Actress (Comedy) for Tracy Dawson, Best Supporting Actor (Comedy) for Ernie Grunwald, and Best Guest Actress (Comedy) for Rachel Blanchard. The show also swept other comedy categories including Best Directing, Best Writing, Best Picture Editing, and Best Sound.

Jason Priestley took home the award for Best TV Performance (Male) at the Canadian Comedy Awards. The show was also nominated for Best TV Show and Best Writing. At the Monte Carlo Television Festival, the show received Best International Producing and Best Acting nominations for Jason Priestley, Ernie Grunwald, Brooke Nevin, and Kathleen Munroe.

Additional nominations include Best TV Show and Best Production Design at the DGC Awards and Best Sitcom at the Banff World Media Festival.

In 2010, Jason Priestley received the Best Actor Award at the Roma Fiction Festival.

The show won Best Comedy at the Canadian Screen Awards in both 2014 and 2015 and was crowned Best Comedy at the Directors Guild Awards for all four seasons.

Reception
The New York Times called the series "A refreshingly original concept... It deftly draws a world in which sin and sexual charisma come at full new-model cost... [FITZ] is King of Front-Wheel Drive and Back-Seat Romps."

Orange County, CA  Film Commission President Paul Ruffino said about the series "A satirical demonic view of the menagerie of mediocrity called mankind. Bawdy and expertly written Call Me Fitz is TV platinum.  HBO Canada? What about the lower 48...come on...we deserve genuine entertainment down here. A hit for sure!"

TV Guide wrote "The snappy, obscenity-filled dialogue was laugh-out-loud funny without being over the top. I call this one a hit."

Episodes

Series overview

Season 1

Season 2 
Season 2 premiered on HBO Canada on September 25, 2011.

Season 3 
Season 3 premiered on HBO Canada on September 23, 2012,

Season 4 
Michael Gross  joins the cast for season 4.  Season 4 premiered on October 7, 2013, on Movie Central (western Canada) and The Movie Network (eastern Canada).

Home video releases
Entertainment One released the first season of Call Me Fitz on DVD in Region 1 on September 27, 2011. It was released on Blu-ray in Region B (The Netherlands) on October 26, 2011. There was also a German Region B blu-ray of Season 1 released in 2015, as well as on DVD, though no other seasons were released in that country.

Though not officially released in other regions, the Blu-ray for the season one release is available via import.

Season 2 has been released in region 1 on DVD  on March 13, 2012. Entertainment One Benelux, the distributor of the season 1 Blu-ray, has indicated on July 9, 2012 that there are no plans to release season 2 on Blu-ray as well.

Season 3 was released in region 1 on DVD on August 27, 2013.

Season 4 has not been released on DVD in any territory so far (2018).

All four seasons are available as digital downloads from such sites as Amazon and iTunes in both SD and HD, but only in the USA.

References

External links
 Official Website
 Official Facebook Fan Page
 Official Show Twitter
 Official YouTube Channel
 Official Call Me Fitz Blog
 Call Me Fitz at HBO Canada
 Call Me Fitz at DIRECTV
 
 Call Me Fitz at E1 Entertainment

2010s Canadian sitcoms
2010s Canadian workplace comedy television series
2010 Canadian television series debuts
2013 Canadian television series endings
Television shows set in Nova Scotia
Television shows filmed in Nova Scotia
Television series by Entertainment One
Television series by Bell Media
Television series by Corus Entertainment
Crave original programming
Gemini and Canadian Screen Award for Best Comedy Series winners
Audience (TV network) original programming